Piz Maler is a mountain of the Swiss Lepontine Alps, located south of Sedrun in the canton of Graubünden. It lies at the northern end of the range between Lai da Curnera and Lai da Nalps.

References

External links
 Piz Maler on Hikr

Mountains of Switzerland
Mountains of Graubünden
Mountains of the Alps
Lepontine Alps
Tujetsch